Sumaya Farhat Naser (born 11 June 1948 in Bir Zeit) is a Palestinian Christian peace activist in the West Bank.

She attended Talitha Kumi, a boarding school in Beit Jala which was founded by Lutheran deaconesses in the 19th century. After gaining her university entrance qualification, she studied biology, geography and education at the University of Hamburg, Germany and received a doctor's degree in applied botany.

Between 1982 and 1997 she was a university lecturer in botany and ecology at the Palestinian Birzeit University north of Ramallah. Between 1997 and 2001 she was the manager of the Palestinian Jerusalem Center for Women, working for peace together with the Israeli group Bat Shalom.

Sumaya Farhat-Naser is known for her clear expressions of opinion in the media, and particularly for her various projects, in which she motivates Palestinian women to work on a peaceful resolution to the Israeli–Palestinian conflict.

Publications
 Thymian und Steine (autobiography), Lenos Verlag, Basel 1995, 
 Daughter of the Olive Trees, Lenos Verlag, Basel 2003, 
 Disteln im Weinberg. Tagebuch aus Palästina, Lenos, Basel 2007, 
 Im Schatten des Feigenbaums, Lenos, Basel 2013, 
 Ein Leben für den Frieden, Lesebuch aus Palästina. Lenos, Basel 2017,

Awards
 1989 Honorary Doctorate from the Theological Faculty of the University of Münster, Germany
 1995 Bruno-Kreisky-Award for merits on Human Rights
 1997 Mount Zion Award for Reconciliation
 1997 Evangelical Book Award
 2000 Peace Award of the City of Augsburg
 2002 Hermann-Kesten-Medaille of the P.E.N.-Center
 2002 Solidarity Award of the city of Bremen
 2003 Profax-Preis of Pädagogische Hochschule Zürich
 2011 AMOS-Prize for Civil Courage PNN

See also
 Palestinian Christians

References

External links

 Biography 

1948 births
Living people
Palestinian activists
Palestinian Christian pacifists
Lutheran pacifists
Palestinian women
University of Hamburg alumni
Academic staff of Birzeit University
Palestinian Christians